Matthew Bradley (born August 19, 1999) is an American college basketball player for the San Diego State Aztecs of the Mountain West Conference (MWC). He previously played for the California Golden Bears.

High school career
As a freshman, Bradley played varsity basketball for Rancho Cucamonga High School in Rancho Cucamonga, California but missed most of the season with a broken foot. For his sophomore season, he transferred to San Bernardino High School in San Bernardino, California, which was closer to home, and sat out one month due to transfer rules. Early in his junior season, Bradley posted three straight 40-point games at the BattleZone Tournament. On January 12, 2017, he scored a school-record 72 points and grabbed 15 rebounds in an 88–55 win over Rubidoux High School. As a junior, Bradley averaged 31 points, 11 rebounds, five assists and four steals per game and was named California Interscholastic Federation Division IV Player of the Year. For his senior season, he moved to Wasatch Academy in Mount Pleasant, Utah to compete at the national level against better competition. Bradley helped his team achieve a 24–2 record and a number 13 national ranking. He played in the Ballislife All-American Game in May 2018.

Recruiting
Bradley was a consensus four-star recruit, with Rivals.com considering him the 53rd-best player in the 2018 class. On June 1, 2017, after his junior season, he committed to play college basketball for California over offers from San Diego State, Utah and Utah State, among others. Bradley was drawn to the program by head coach Wyking Jones.

College career

On November 9, 2018, Bradley made his debut for California, scoring 13 points in a 76–59 loss to Yale. On February 24, 2019, he recorded his first double-double with a freshman season-high 23 points, making five three-pointers, and 10 rebounds in a 69–59 loss to Arizona State. As a freshman, Bradley averaged 10.9 points, 3.6 rebounds and two assists per game. He shot 47.2 percent from three-point range, setting a school freshman record. In his sophomore season, Bradley had an expanded role with the departure of leading scorer Justice Sueing. On January 9, 2020, Bradley posted 26 points, 10 rebounds and four assists in a 73–66 victory over Washington State. In his next game, he made a game-winning three-pointer with six seconds left in overtime against Washington, 61–58. As a sophomore, he averaged 17.5 points, 4.9 rebounds and 1.5 assists per game and was named to the Second Team All-Pac-12. In his junior season, he averaged 17.9 points, 4.6 rebounds and 1.7 assists per game and repeated as a Second Team All-Pac-12 selection.

On April 12, 2021, Bradley announced that he would transfer to San Diego State. He was named to the First Team All-Mountain West. Bradley averaged 16.9 points and 5.4 rebounds per game. He opted to return for his fifth season of eligibility, in order to complete his degree in criminal justice. On December 31, Bradley scored 23 points in a 76-67 victory at UNLV and surpassed the 2,000 point threshold.

Career statistics

College

|-
| style="text-align:left;"| 2018–19
| style="text-align:left;"| California
| 31 || 19 || 28.4 || .411 || .472 || .791 || 3.6 || 2.0 || 0.9 || 0.4 || 10.8
|-
| style="text-align:left;"| 2019–20
| style="text-align:left;"| California
| 32 || 30 || 33.2 || .437 || .384 || .868 || 4.9 || 1.5 || 0.5 || 0.2 || 17.5
|-
| style="text-align:left;"| 2020–21
| style="text-align:left;"| California
| 22 || 19 || 30.2 || .455 || .364 || .821 || 4.6 || 1.7 || 0.4 || 0.2 || 18.0
|-
| style="text-align:left;"| 2021–22
| style="text-align:left;"| San Diego State
| 32 || 32 || 31.5 || .438 || .401 || .779 || 5.4 ||2.7 || 1.0 || 0.2 || 16.9
|-
| style="text-align:left;"| 2022–23
| style="text-align:left;"| San Diego State
| 33 || 33 || 26.6 || .411 || .377 || .802 || 3.8 || 2.1 || 0.7 || 0.2 || 12.9
|-
|- class="sortbottom"
| style="text-align:center;" colspan="2"| Career
| 150 || 133 || 30.0 || .431 || .397 || .815 || 4.5 || 2.0 || 0.7 || 0.2 || 15.1

References

External links
San Diego State Aztecs bio
California Golden Bears bio

1999 births
Living people
American men's basketball players
Basketball players from California
California Golden Bears men's basketball players
People from Rancho Cucamonga, California
San Diego State Aztecs men's basketball players
Shooting guards